HXD3 is an electric locomotive built in Mainland China by CNR Dalian Locomotives.

The locomotive is designed for hauling 5,000t freight trains on main lines. It was jointly developed by CNR Dalian Locomotives and Toshiba.

The first prototype (SSJ3-0001) was rolled out from Dalian and underwent testing on the loop track of Beijing CARS in 2004.

Dalian commenced mass production of the locomotive in 2004 with an order of 60 pieces by the Ministry of Railways (MOR). The first mass-produced locomotive was rolled out in 2006. MOR later increased the order from 60 to 240, than to 640, and finally to 1040 locomotives.

Most locomotives were allocated on Jinghu Railway and Jingguang Railway on freight schedules.

Gallery

External links

 HXD3 Electric Locomotive (CRRC　Dalian)
 Spec Sheet; French
 Locomotive and Container Car System Supporting Modern Distribution and Transportation 

25 kV AC locomotives
Co-Co locomotives
HXD3
Toshiba locomotives
CRRC Dalian locomotives
Railway locomotives introduced in 2004
Standard gauge locomotives of China